WWCC-LP (97.3 FM) is a radio station licensed to the Triangle Foundation, based in Lafayette, Indiana. WWCC broadcasts at an effective radiated power of 14 watts.  The station office is located 101 N. 10th St.Lafayette, IN with a tower facility located on South 30th Street in Lafayette, IN.

History
WWCC began broadcasting in April, 2005 with an Inspirational format, featuring Bible teaching, talk, and Christian Contemporary praise and worship music.  WWCC is the only Christian teaching station in Lafayette that is based in Lafayette.

External links
 

WCC-LP
WCC-LP
WCC-LP
2005 establishments in Indiana
Radio stations established in 2005